Donie Ryan (born 26 December 1976) is an Irish former hurler. At club level he played with Garryspillane and was also a member of the Limerick senior hurling team. He usually lined out as a forward.

Career

Ryan first played hurling at juvenile and underage levels with the Garryspillane club and had a career that spanned 25 years with the club's top adult team. During that time, he won three County Championship titles in three different grades, including a County Senior Championship title in 2005. Ryan first came to prominence on the inter-county scene at the underage and intermediate levels with Limerick. He joined his brother, T. J. Ryan, on the Limerick senior hurling team for the Oireachtas Cup in 1997, however, it was 2002 before he established himself on the team. Ryan was at left corner-forward when Limerick lost the 2007 All-Ireland final to Kilkenny. His inter-county career ended when he was dropped from the panel in 2011.

Career statistics

Honours

Garryspillane
Limerick Senior Hurling Championship: 2005
Limerick Premier Intermediate Hurling Championship: 2018
Limerick Intermediate Hurling Championship: 1996
Limerick Under-21 Hurling Championship: 1995

References 

1976 births
Living people
Garryspillane hurlers
Limerick inter-county hurlers